The Vallon des Auffes is a little traditional fishing haven in Marseille in the 7th arrondissement of Marseille. It is situated 2.5 km south-west of the Vieux-Port over the corniche Kennedy, between the Catalans beach and Malmousque bay.

History 

This small port / valley houses, on both sides of the bridge, about fifty fishermen's cabins and small traditional fishing boats, including some traditional pointu boats. The catch is reserved for local restaurants.

It takes its name from "" ("auffo" in provençal dialect), or "" (Stipa tenacissima), a sort of grass used to make rope, braids, and fishing nets.

The reinforced concrete arched bridge, made from stone masonry, forms three semicircular arches each 17 m (56 ft) tall. It crosses the port with a total length of 60 m (200 ft). It was built in the 19th century, during the construction of the Corniche of President John F. Kennedy. The cove was blocked off during the construction of the foundations in order to keep it dry.

In 1927, the President of France Gaston Doumergue inaugurated the monument to the dead of the East Army and the far lands, a 5 m tall bronze statue of a woman with arms raised to the sky, facing the Mediterranean Sea. It was classified as a historic monument on July 23, 2009.

From 1998 to 2006, a large painted mural of the famous footballer from Marseille, Zinedine Zidane, was put up by Adidas over the valley with the annotation "Made in Marseille". This was then replaced by a Coca-Cola advert. In 2013, when Marseille was awarded the title of the European capital of culture, the artist JR revealed a poster of an unknown woman from Marseille (Annick Perrot-Bishop) as a nod to that of the famous footballer, in order to illustrate the opening of Marseille to the world.  This portrait has in turn been replaced by an advert for a famous brand of sunglasses.

Ce petit port / vallon abrite de part et d'autre du pont, une cinquantaine de cabanons de pêcheurs et de petits bateaux de pêche traditionnelle, don't quelques pointus typiques, don't les prises sont réservées aux restaurants locaux.

Il tire son nom de l'auffe (auffo en provençal) ou alfa, sorte de plante graminée utilisée pour fabriquer des cordages de navires, des nattes et des filets de pêche.

Le pont en béton armé voûte constitué en pierres maçonnées forme trois arches en plein cintre de  de haut et 100 grades de biais. Il enjambe le port sur une longueur de . Il est bâti au XIXe siècle, lors de la construction de la corniche du Président-John-Fitzgerald-Kennedy. L'anse a été barrée lors de la construction des foundations afin de la maintenir au sec.

En 1927, le président Gaston Doumergue inaugure le monument aux morts de l'Armée d'Orient et des terres lointaines, une statue en bronze de 5 m de haut représentant une femme les bras levés au ciel face à la Méditerranée, classée monument historique le 23 juillet 2009.

De 1998 à 2006, une immense peinture murale du célèbre footballeur marseillais Zinedine Zidane est apposée par Adidas au-dessus du vallon avec l’annotation « Made in Marseille ». Elle est ensuite remplacée par une publicité Coca-Cola. En 2013, à l'occasion de l'événement de Marseille au titre de capitale européenne de la culture, l'artiste JR expose l'affiche d'un inconnue marseillaise (Annick Perrot-Bishop) à titre de clin d’œil à celle du célèbre footballeur marseillais, pour illustrer l'ouverture de Marseille au monde. Le portrait est remplacé à son tour par une publicité d'une célèbre marque de lunettes.

In popular culture 
 Plusieurs films ont été tournés sur le petit port don't The French Connection de William Friedkin en 1971 et L'Immortel de Richard Berry en 2009 ainsi que le feuilleton télévisé Zodiaque de Claude-Michel Rome en 2004.

 Jean Bazal, journaliste spécialiste du milieu marseillais et auteur français de roman policier et roman d'espionnage, réside au vallon des Auffes.
 L'action du livre Le Lessiveur de 2009 de Franz-Olivier Giesbert, se situe à Marseille et notamment au vallon des Auffes.

See also 

 Port de Marseille
 Pointu (embarcation)
 Corniche du Président-John-Fitzgerald-Kennedy
 Monument aux morts de l'Armée d'Orient et des terres lointaines

References

External links 

Fishing communities in France
7th arrondissement of Marseille